Line 70 is a railway line connecting Luxembourg City to the south-west of Luxembourg, and on to Belgium and France.  The terminus at the north-eastern end is Luxembourg railway station, whilst the terminals at the south are the French town of Longuyon and the Belgian town of Athus.  It is designated, and predominantly operated, by Chemins de Fer Luxembourgeois During the 2010 decade, the former line 80 have been merged with this line in order to give the newly created line between Thionville and Longwy via Esch-sur-Alzette.

Stations
 Luxembourg
 Hollerich
 Leudelange
 Dippach-Reckange
 Schouweiler
 Bascharage-Sanem
 Pétange
 Lamadelaine
 Rodange
 Athus (Belgium)
 Messancy (Belgium)
 Arlon (Belgium)
 Aubange (Belgium)
 Halanzy (Belgium)
 Virton (Belgium)
 Bertrix (Belgium)
 Libramont (Belgium)
 Longwy (France)
 Longuyon (France)

Former line 80 

This former line, now part of the line 70, is designated Chemins de Fer Luxembourgeois, but predominantly operated by NMBS/SNCB.  On the Belgian side of the border the routes are numbered in the NMBS/SNCB series.
 Line 165 Libramont - Virton - Y Aubange - Athus
 Line 165/1 Y Aubange - Frontière RFNL (Rodange)
 Line 167 (Arlon) - Y. Autelbas - Athus - Frontière RFNL (Rodange)

The routes are all electrified at 25 kV using OHL cf NMBS/SNCB's normal 3 kV DC OHL. This requires NMBS/SNCB to use Class 41xx DMUs.

References 

Railway lines in Luxembourg